Ferdinand is a Germanic given name. For more details including a list of aristocracy see Ferdinand.

Ferdinand may also refer to:

Places

United States 
Ferdinand, Idaho, a city
Ferdinand, Indiana, a town
Ferdinand, Vermont, a town

Elsewhere 
Siġġiewi (Città Ferdinand), largest city in Malta by area
Montana, Bulgaria, formerly named Ferdinand (1890-1945)
Mihail Kogălniceanu, Constanța, Romania, formerly named Ferdinand I (1930s-1948)
Nicolae Bălcescu, Bacău, Romania, formerly named Ferdinand (? to 1948)
Ferdinand (moon), a moon of Uranus

People 
Ferdinand, European nobility
Ferdinand (surname), a list of people
Ferdinand (dancer) (1791–1837), stage name of French ballet dancer Jean La Brunière de Médicis

Animals 
Ferdinand (horse) (1983–2002), racehorse
Ferdinand (chimpanzee)
Ferdinand is a fictional bull in the children’s book The Story of Ferdinand

Other uses
Ferdinand, the main character of The Story of Ferdinand
Ferdinand (film), a 2017 animated film adaptation from Blue Sky Studios
Elefant, a World War II German self-propelled antitank gun originally named Ferdinand, after its designer Ferdinand Porsche

See also 
 Ferd'nand, a comic-strip character syndicated by United Media
 Emperor Ferdinand (disambiguation)
 Ferd (disambiguation)
 Ferdinand A. Porsche (disambiguation)
 Ferdinand Barnett (disambiguation)
 Ferdinand, Duke of Genoa (disambiguation)
 Ferdinando (disambiguation)
 Fernand